Pedayerukapadu is one of the oldest areas  of Gudivada. Gudivada is a census town in Krishna district in the Indian state of Andhra Pradesh.

References

Villages in Krishna district